Take It Out in Trade: The Outtakes is a compilation film of bloopers, alternate takes, behind-the-scenes footage, and deleted scenes from the 1970 soft-core pornographic film, Take It Out in Trade, directed by Ed Wood  The footage is completely silent with an instrumental musical score.

History

Take It Out in Trade was written and directed by Wood during his long downward spiral into alcoholism and pornography. Long (though disputedly) believed to be a lost film, three cans of outtake footage were found in the projection booth of a Santa Monica movie theatre and released on VHS by Something Weird Video in 1995 as Take It Out in Trade: The Outtakes. Rudolph Grey, the author of Wood biography Nightmare of Ecstasy (1992), claimed he located a print during research for his book. The outtakes were the only commercially available footage from the production for over twenty years, until the full 80-minute film's recovery, restoration and release on Blu-ray in 2018. The eventual home video release was sourced from a 16mm theatrical print and scanned by the American Genre Film Archive (AGFA).

See also
Ed Wood filmography

References

Further reading
 The Haunted World of Edward D. Wood, Jr. (1996), documentary film directed by Brett Thompson
 Rudolph Grey, Nightmare of Ecstasy: The Life and Art of Edward D. Wood, Jr. (1992)

External links 
 

1995 films
Films directed by Ed Wood
Documentary films about films
Documentary films about American pornography
Compilation films
Films with screenplays by Ed Wood
American silent feature films
Silent films in color
1990s American films